FC Tucson is an American soccer club based in Tucson, Arizona that plays in USL League Two. The club has an amateur women’s team, FC Tucson Women, that play in the WPSL. Organized in 2010, the club first fielded a team in March 2011, then joined the Premier Development League (PDL; now known as USL League Two) Western Conference in 2012. in 2018, FC Tucson was a founding member of USL League One, where they played from 2019–2022. At the conclusion of the 2022 season, the ownership group changed and the team self-relegated back to USL League Two.

Tucson plays their home games at the 3,200-seat Kino Sports Complex North Stadium constructed in 2013.

History

Beginnings
FC Tucson was founded in 2010 to bring preseason Major League Soccer events to Tucson and generate interest in a new soccer club.  The organization first fielded a team on March 4, 2011 against the New York Red Bulls reserves in the 2011 Desert Cup, a 3–1 loss.  The club's first goal was scored by former Pima Community College and Salpointe Catholic High School player Fernando Gauna after entering the match as a substitute.  Later in 2011 Tucson competed against various teams from the region in a loosely organized exhibition league. Their first match following the Desert Cup took place on May 13, a 7–2 victory over Yavapai FC. On December 15, 2011, FC Tucson announced its move to the PDL.

Early PDL and Open Cup success

In its first season of play in the United Soccer League's Premier Development League (USL PDL, now USL League Two) the team placed second in the Western Conference Southwest Division with a record of 9 wins, 3 losses and 4 ties, riding a ten-game unbeaten streak (7 wins, 3 ties) from May 12 until June 30. In postseason play Tucson lost 2–1 to Seattle Sounders FC U-23 in the Western Conference Semi-Finals. Defender Conor Spence was named to the All-Western Conference Team. The club was named 2012 PDL Rookie Franchise of the Year.

In May 2013 FC Tucson notched back-to-back victories over professional clubs to reach the third round of the 2013 Lamar Hunt U.S. Open Cup. In the tournament's first round Tucson defeated Phoenix FC of the USL Pro 2–1 on an injury-time game winner scored by Connor Bevans. Next they defeated the San Antonio Scorpions of the NASL in a 4–3 penalty shoot-out to break a 2–2 tie. The run ended in Houston where they fell 2–0 to the MLS Dynamo.  As the first ever PDL club to defeat professional clubs in back-to-back matches, Tucson won the full $15,000 prize awarded to the PDL club with the best Open Cup finish. (Three other PDL teams also reached the third round.) Tucson did not qualify for the PDL postseason in 2013, finishing fifth in the Southwest with five wins, five losses, and 4 draws.

Mountain Division Dominance
In 2014, competing in the newly created Mountain Division, FC Tucson won its first division title with 11 wins, 1 draw, and 2 losses in league play.  The club recorded its first ever playoff victory with a 2–1 win over the Los Angeles Misioneros in Las Vegas. The best regular-season record in the Western Conference earned Tucson the right to host the conference final four at Kino North Stadium where they defeated the Vancouver Whitecaps FC U-23 1–0 in the conference semifinals on a stoppage-time goal by Juan Sebastian De Rada. Tucson's postseason run came to an end in the Western Conference Championship game with a 3–0 loss to the Kitsap Pumas. Team captain Ricardo Velazco, a midfielder, was named PDL Young (U21) Player of the Year. Billy Thompson was named PDL Goalkeeper of the Year. Both players were named to the All-League and All-Western Conference Teams. FC Tucson was named PDL Organization of the Year.

Tucson claimed its second-straight Mountain Division title in 2015 with a record of 8–2–4 in regular-season Premier Development League play.  Their two losses came against Albuquerque Sol FC on the road and Real Colorado at home.  In a July 4 home rematch against Albuquerque Tucson won 2–0 to claim the 2015 Southwestern Showdown rivalry series and retain possession of the Golden Rattler trophy.  Tucson's regular season concluded with four straight wins: at home against Real Colorado and against the Sol, and on the road against the Southwest Division's Fresno Fuego and OC Blues U23.  The streak put Tucson one point ahead of the Sol in the final PDL Mountain Division standings.

Tucson defeated Albuquerque 2–1 at home in the 2015 postseason qualifier, and once again was selected to host the Western Conference final four.  After beating the previously-undefeated Kitsap Pumas 4–1 in the semis, the home side lost in the conference championship for the second-straight year, this time to the Seattle Sounders FC U-23 by a score of 2–1. Forward Pedro Espindola and Defender Kalem Scott were named to the All-Western Conference team.

Professional

FC Tucson was purchased by Phoenix Rising FC of the United Soccer League, now known as the USL Championship, on October 11, 2017, and initially served as its PDL affiliate. The 2018 season was ultimately FC Tucson's last in the PDL, since renamed USL League Two.

FC Tucson became the second team (and the first pre-existing team) to join the USL Division III league (later renamed USL League One) on February 6, 2018. Thus, the team became fully professional.

On February 18, 2021, FC Tucson announced that Benevolent Sports Tucson LLC, led by Brett Johnson, completed the transfer of ownership from Phoenix Rising FC. The team was no longer affiliated with Rising FC and was again eligible to participate in the U.S. Open Cup.

On October 18, 2022, following a 10th place finish in USL League One, Benevolent Sports Tucson announced the sale of the FC Tucson brand rights to an ownership group led by FC Tucson co-founder Jon Pearlman. As part of the transfer in ownership, FC Tucson also announced a self-relegation back to USL League Two for the 2023 season. The team retains the rights to a USL League One franchise, pending the construction of their own soccer-specific stadium.

Ownership
 FC Tucson Events, LLC (Greg Foster, Chris Keeney, Jon Pearlman & Rick Schantz) (until 2017)
 Phoenix Rising FC (2017–2021)
 Benevolent Sports Tucson, LLC (2021–2022)
 Jon Pearlman, Jeff Arnold (2022–present)

Colors and badge
Tucson FC's official colors are red, black, and white.

FC Tucson's badge was designed by Erik von Weber prior to the 2011 Desert Cup. Similar in appearance to the traditional soccer shield, the badge is instead shaped like an arrowhead in homage to Tucson's pre-Columbian history. The badge was simplified in 2012 with the removal of five diamonds which arced above the crest to represent the major mountain ranges of the Tucson valley but had been confused with stars, typically used in football badges to represent titles won.

Sponsorship

Stadium
 Murphey Field at Mulcahy Stadium (2011)
 Kino Sports Complex North Field #5 (2012–2013)
 Kino Sports Complex North Stadium (2014–present)

Kino North Stadium was dedicated on October 30, 2013. The stadium seats 2,900, with 1,800 in a partially-covered grandstand on the west sideline. The stadium's construction was part of a larger package of soccer facilities improvements to the Kino Sports Complex approved by Pima County's Board of Supervisors in April 2012. FC Tucson defeated MLS side Chivas USA 1–0 on November 15, 2013, in the first match held at the stadium.

Club culture

Supporters
Members of the local American Outlaws chapter organized an FC Tucson supporters group called the Cactus Pricks after FC Tucson's 2011 Desert Cup appearance.

Rivalries

In 2014 FC Tucson announced the Southwestern Showdown, an annual series with Albuquerque Sol FC, a PDL expansion team placed with Tucson in the Western Conference's newly formed Mountain Division. The club earning the most league points over all regular-season meetings is awarded "The Golden Rattler" trophy to hold for the following year. Ties are broken by goal difference or, if there is none, final division standings. For the final match of the series in both 2014 and 2015, the club wore red jerseys, white shorts, and blue socks in celebration of the 4th of July holiday. On both occasions, Tucson won to claim the series title.

La Copa Frontera, a supporters cup competition organized by the Cactus Pricks, the Las Vegas Mobsters' Mob Squad, and Albuquerque's Sandianistas, was organized in 2015. In that year the Sol claimed La Copa with a sweep of the Mobsters, despite ultimately finishing second to Tucson in head-to-head competition by virtue of goal difference.

Record

Year-by-year

1. Top Scorer includes statistics from league matches only.

Head coaches
 Includes Regular Season, Playoffs & U.S. Open Cup. Excludes friendlies.

Players and staff

Staff

Notable former players

  Jon Bakero
  Brandon Beresford
  Justin Bilyeu
  Connor Brandt
  Aaron Long
  Aaron Herrera
  Kendall McIntosh
  Billy Thompson
  Donny Toia
  Christian Volesky
  Ricardo Velazco
  Kody Wakasa

Honors

League
USL PDL Mountain Division
Champions (3): 2014, 2015, 2017
USL PDL Southwest Division
Champions (1): 2016

Player honors

References

External links

 

 
Sports in Tucson, Arizona
Soccer clubs in Arizona
2010 establishments in Arizona
Tucson, FC
Association football clubs established in 2010
Former USL League One teams